A municipal district (MD) is the most common form of all rural municipality statuses used in the Canadian province of Alberta. Alberta's municipal districts, most of which are branded as a county (e.g. Yellowhead County, County of Newell, etc.), are predominantly rural areas that may include either farmland, Crown land or a combination of both depending on their geographic location. They may also include country residential subdivisions and unincorporated communities, some of which are recognized as hamlets by Alberta Municipal Affairs.

Municipal districts are created when predominantly rural areas with populations of at least 1,000 people, where a majority of their residential buildings are on parcels of land greater than 1,850 m2, apply to Alberta Municipal Affairs for municipal district status under the authority of the Municipal Government Act. Applications for municipal district status are approved via orders in council made by the Lieutenant Governor in Council under recommendation from the Minister of Municipal Affairs.

As of the 2011 Census, Alberta's then 64 municipal districts (Lac La Biche County has since then converted to a specialized municipality) had a cumulative population of 451,979 and an average population of 7,062. Alberta's most populous and least populated municipal districts are Rocky View County and the MD of Ranchland No. 66 with populations of 36,461 and 79 respectively. 

437 elected officials (eight mayors, 56 reeves and 373 councillors) provide municipal district governance throughout the province.


Branding 
An order in council to incorporate any municipality must give the municipality an official name. Of Alberta's 63 municipal districts, 16 still have municipal district in their official names, while 47 of them have branded themselves as a county in their official names. Twenty-five of Alberta's municipal district's retain a numerical designation (e.g. "No. 8") in their official names.

The use of the county term in the official names of 47 municipal districts (and three specialized municipalities) has partially led to a common belief that a county is its own separate municipal status type, which is not the case. The other major contributor to this common belief is that a county was once a former municipal status type in Alberta prior to the County Act being repealed in the mid-1990s. Those municipalities that were once officially incorporated as counties were continued under the Municipal Government Act (MGA) as municipal districts and were permitted to retain the term county in their official names.

Municipal office locations 
More than half of the 63 municipal districts have their main administration offices, including council chambers, in a separate municipality such as a city, town, or village. This municipality (like all other cities, towns, and villages) is not part of the municipal district's jurisdiction. Nine municipal districts have their offices in a hamlet, which is part of the district's jurisdiction. They are Acadia (Acadia Valley), Bighorn (Exshaw), Birch Hills (Wanham), Clear Hills (Worsley), Cypress (Dunmore), Grande Prairie (Clairmont), Lac Ste. Anne (Sangudo), Opportunity (Wabasca), and Thorhild (Thorhild). One municipal district, Ranchland, has its offices in a provincial park, Chain Lakes Provincial Park. Thirteen municipal districts have their offices in their jurisdiction, outside the boundaries of a city, town, or village. They are Brazeau (Drayton Valley), Lacombe (between Gull Lake and Lacombe), Mountain View (Didsbury), Newell (Brooks), Northern Sunrise (Peace River), Paintearth (Castor), Parkland (Stony Plain), Peace (Berwyn), Red Deer (Red Deer), Saddle Hills (Spirit River), Wheatland (Strathmore), Willow Creek (Claresholm), and Woodlands (Whitecourt).

List 
The below table is a list of only those rural municipalities in Alberta that are incorporated as municipal districts. 

Despite their names, Lac La Biche County, Mackenzie County, and Strathcona County are not listed because they are in fact incorporated as specialized municipalities, not municipal districts. The Regional Municipality of Wood Buffalo is likewise a specialized municipality and is thus not listed here. For more information on specialized municipalities, see List of specialized municipalities in Alberta. 

Alberta's eight improvement districts and three special areas are also not listed because they are their own separate type of rural municipality and not subset types of the municipal district status. For more information on special areas, see Special Areas Board.

Former municipal districts

Changed status

Dissolved

See also 

Administrative divisions of Canada
List of census divisions of Alberta
List of communities in Alberta
List of designated places in Alberta
List of hamlets in Alberta
List of Indian reserves in Alberta
List of municipalities in Alberta
List of rural municipalities in Manitoba
List of rural municipalities in Saskatchewan
List of specialized municipalities in Alberta
Special Areas Board

References

External links 
 Alberta Association of Municipal Districts and Counties (AAMDC)
 AAMDC - The Members
 Alberta Municipal Affairs

 
Municipal Districts